Cláudia Rodrigues Ferreira de Carvalho, also Claudia Rodrigues-Carvalho, is a Brazilian archaeologist and is the director of the Science House of the Federal University of Rio de Janeiro (UFRJ) since 2018. She was the director of the UFRJ from 2010 to 2018. de Carvalho is also assistant professor of the Sector of Biological Anthropology of the Department of Anthropology of the National Museum.

Biography 
De Carvalho graduated from Estácio de Sá Universities in 1994 and went on to get a specialization in paleopathology the same year. She then continued to complete her master's degree in public health in 1997. De Carvalho completed a PhD in public health in 2004. All these were through the National School of Public Health Sérgio Arouca. Working with the National Museum of Brazil, de Carvalho is focused on the field of biological anthropology, related to human evolution and forensic anthropology. As an adjunct professor de Carvalho is responsible for portions of the Postgraduate Program in Archaeology, the specialization course in Quaternary Geology and undergraduate course in Biomedical Sciences at UFRJ.

References 

Year of birth missing (living people)
Living people
Brazilian archaeologists
Brazilian women archaeologists
20th-century Brazilian people
21st-century Brazilian people
Brazilian women scientists
20th-century women scientists
21st-century women scientists
National Museum of Brazil